Lieutenant General Sir Francis Ivan Simms Tuker KCIE CB DSO OBE (4 July 1894 – 7 October 1967) was a senior British Indian Army officer who commanded the 4th Indian Infantry Division during the Second World War and who requested the bombing of the historical Monte Cassino Abbey in 1944 which led to its complete destruction.

Early life
The son of William J. Sanger Tuker, of Butts Green Hall, Sandon, Essex, by his marriage to Katherine Louisa Simms, of Yew House, Twickenham, Tuker was educated at Brighton College, East Sussex, of which he was in later life a governor, and attended the Royal Military College, Sandhurst, from 1912 to 1913.

Military career
Commissioned as a second lieutenant into the British Army's Royal Sussex Regiment in 1914, later that year Tuker transferred to the 2nd Gurkha Rifles of the Indian Army, in which he was commissioned as a second lieutenant on 10 October. He saw active service in the First World War and served as an acting captain from 14 March to 12 April 1916, and was promoted to the substantive rank of lieutenant on 17 August 1917, back-dated to 1 September 1915. Promoted to captain on 14 January 1918, he took part in the Kuki Punitive expedition that year and, after the war, was an officer of the North West Persia operations between 1920 and 1921.

After attending the Staff College, Camberley from 1925 to 1926, Tuker was promoted to major on 14 January 1932, brevetted to lieutenant colonel on 1 July 1933, and promoted to lieutenant colonel on 1 February 1937, at which time he was appointed Commanding Officer (CO) of the 1st Battalion, 2nd Gurkha Rifles. For his part in operations in Waziristan that year, he was appointed an OBE (Mil.) on 21 December and was mentioned in dispatches in February 1938.

On 27 October 1939, a month after the outbreak of the Second World War, Tuker was promoted to full colonel (with seniority from 1 July 1936). He became Director of Military Training in India in 1940. A temporary brigadier by this time, he was appointed General Officer Commanding (GOC) 34th Indian Infantry Division on 1 October 1941 with the acting rank of major-general. He took over command of the 4th Indian Infantry Division on 30 December 1941 and then commanded it during the Western Desert and Italian campaigns.

Promoted to temporary major-general on 1 October 1942, he was mentioned in dispatches on 15 December 1942 and again on 24 June 1943. Promoted to major-general on 31 May 1943, he was appointed a CB on 5 August 1943.

In early 1944, towards the end of Tuker's time in Italy, during the Battle of Monte Cassino, Allied commanders were engaged in a controversy regarding what action should be taken against the monastery at Monte Cassino. The Germans had declared it a military-free zone but many senior commanders were reluctant to believe that the Germans would not occupy such a strategically important position. Tuker had found a book dated 1879 in a Naples bookshop giving details of the construction of the monastery at Monte Cassino which his division was to attack. He wrote a memorandum to his Corps commander, Lieutenant-General Bernard Freyberg, concluding that it should be demolished to prevent its occupation. He also pointed out that with 150-foot (45 m) high walls made of masonry at least 10 feet (3 m) thick, there was no practical means for field engineers to deal with the place, and that bombing with blockbuster bombs would be the only solution since 1,000 pound bombs would be "next to useless". General Sir Harold Alexander, commanding the Allied Armies in Italy, agreed to the bombing (which did not employ blockbuster bombs) and the ruins were occupied by German forces which held the position until 18 May.Following the war, the abbot of the monastery and other monks said that German troops had not occupied the inside of the abbey and it was not being used for military purposes.

Tuker commanded the 4th Indian Division until 4 February 1944 when he became seriously ill and for nearly a year took no part in the war. While recovering he assumed light duties as General Officer Commanding, Ceylon from March 1944 to September 1944, before becoming Chairman of the Frontier Commission in India. On 14 July 1945 he was put in temporary command of the IV Corps in Burma while Frank Messervy took leave for a month, taking part in the defeat of the Japanese at the Battle of the Sittang Bend a breakout attempt at the Sittang in July and August. For his service in Burma he received his final mention in dispatches in September 1946.

Tuker reverted to his substantive rank of major-general and after taking some leave, became Commander, Lucknow District in November 1945. Knighted with the KCIE in the 1946 New Year Honours, he was promoted once more to acting lieutenant-general on 21 January and appointed General Officer Commanding-in-Chief, Eastern Command, India. Promoted to the permanent rank of lieutenant-general on 15 November 1946, he retired on 25 April 1948 and died in 1967. There is a memorial tablet to him in the chapel of Brighton College, below which hangs his sword. At its dedication ceremony, the Band of the Brigade of Gurkhas performed a Beating Retreat on the school's playing field.

Tuker's nickname in the army was "Gertie". He is known for a number of books on military history that he wrote, including The Pattern of War, While Memory Serves and The Yellow Scarf. In his book The Pattern of War he argued that warfare follows a definite pattern.

Private life
In 1923 Tuker married Catherine Isabella Bucknall, in the district of Horsham, Sussex. She died in Cornwall on 2 October 1947 and was buried at St Mawnan and St Stephen's Church, Mawnan. In 1948, in Marylebone, Tuker married secondly Cynthia H. Fawcett.

Tuker's father died on 26 January 1951, aged eighty-nine, when he was still living at Butts Green, Sandon, Essex.

In his book Approach to Battle (1963), Tuker commented on his career: “I have tried my hand at many other things in my life - farming, commercial horticulture, authorship, training horses, painting, etching and engraving, and none have I found so testing and so difficult as the planning and conduct of a successful land battle against a worthy foe, whether against the guerrilla or the enemy who is fully equipped for war.”

Publications

References
Citations

Sources

External links
While Memory Serves
Generals of World War II
Indian Army Officers 1939–1945

|-

|-

|-

Companions of the Distinguished Service Order
Indian Army generals of World War II
1894 births
1967 deaths
Companions of the Order of the Bath
Officers of the Order of the British Empire
Knights Commander of the Order of the Indian Empire
Royal Sussex Regiment officers
People educated at Brighton College
Graduates of the Staff College, Camberley
British Indian Army generals
Graduates of the Royal Military College, Sandhurst
Indian Army personnel of World War I